In Deutschland is a 1965 album by the French pop singer Françoise Hardy. It was her first German-language album released in Germany in September 1965, on LP, Bellaphon/Disques Vogue (BWS 368). The 12 songs of this album have been reissued on CD entitled Frag' den Abendwind, in 2001, on  RCA/BMG (7432 1 844422 7).

Track list 
Side 1
 "Wenn dieses Lied erklingt" – 2:30Lyrics by: Peter WehleMusic written by: Joe Dixie
 "Frag' den Abendwind" – 2:35Lyrics by: Joachim RelinMusic written by: Fred Gordini
 "Dann bist Du verliebt" – 2:38Lyrics by: Joachim RelinMusic written by: Fred Gordini
 "Ein Fenster wird hell" – 2:33Original title: "Dans le monde entier"Lyrics and music written by: Françoise Hardy, 1965German adaptation by: Kurt Hertha
 "Er war wie Du" – 2:13Lyrics by: Ernst BaderMusic written by: Friedel Berlipp
 "Wer Du bist" – 2:25Lyrics by: Fini BuschMusic written by: Werner Scharfenberger

Side 2
 "Ich hab’ das Glück" – 2:06Original title: "J’aurais voulu"Lyrics and music written by: Françoise Hardy, 1963German adaptation by: C. U. Blecher
 "Ich sag’ ja" – 2:20Original title: J’suis d’accordLyrics by: Françoise HardyMusic written by: Françoise Hardy and Roger Samyn, 1962German adaptation by: Kurt Schwabach
 "Peter und Lou" – 2:50Original title: "Tous les garçons et les filles"Lyrics by: Françoise HardyMusic written by: Françoise Hardy and Roger Samyn, 1962German adaptation by: Ernst Bader
 "Die Liebe geht" – 2:25Original title: "L’Amour s’en va"Lyrics and music written by: Françoise Hardy, 1963German adaptation by: Ernst Bader
 "Ich steige Dir auf’s Dach" – 2:18Lyrics  by: Willy SchüllerMusic written by: Georg MöckelFirst performed by: Bärbel Wachholz, 1957
 "Oh, Oh Chérie" – 2:15Original title: "Uh Oh"Lyrics and music written by Bobby Lee TrammellFirst performed by Bobby Lee Trammell in 1958German adaptation by: J.R. Setti and G. Guenet

Notes and references 

Françoise Hardy albums
1965 albums
German-language albums